Ana María Amorer Guerrero (born January 8, 1974) is a pageant titleholder. She was born in Caracas, Venezuela, and is the Miss Venezuela International titleholder for 1994, and was the official representative of Venezuela to the Miss International 1995 pageant held in Tokyo, Japan, on September 10, 1995, when she won the title of 1st runner up.

Amorer competed in the national beauty pageant Miss Venezuela 1994 and obtained the title of Miss Venezuela International. She represented the Apure state.

References

External links
Miss Venezuela Official Website
Miss International Official Website

1974 births
Living people
People from Caracas
Miss Venezuela International winners
Miss International 1995 delegates